Mussurana is a genus of snakes in the family Colubridae. The genus is endemic to South America.

Species and geographic ranges
The genus Mussurana contains the following species which are recognized as being valid.
Mussurana bicolor  – Argentina, southern Brazil, Paraguay, and Peru - two-colored mussurana
Mussurana montana  – southeastern Brazil
Mussurana quimi  – northern Argentina, southeastern Brazil, and Paraguay

Nota bene: A binomial authority in parentheses indicates that the species was originally described in a genus other than Mussurana.

Etymology
The specific name, quimi, is in honor of Brazilian herpetologist Joaquim "Quim" Cavalheiro of the Instituto Butantan.

References

Further reading
Zaher, Hussam; Grazziotin, Felipe Gobbi; Cadle, John E.; Murphy, Robert W.; de Moura-Leite, Julio Cesar; Bonatto, Sandro L. (2009). "Molecular phylogeny of advanced snakes (Serpentes, Caenophidia) with an emphasis on South American Xenodontines: a revised classification and descriptions of new taxa". Papéis Avulsos de Zoologia 49 (11): 115–153. (Mussurana, new genus). (in English, with abstracts in English and Portuguese).

.
Snake genera
Mussurana (genus)